The International Convention for the Prevention of Pollution from Ships, 1973 as modified by the Protocol of 1978, or "MARPOL 73/78" (short for "marine pollution") is one of the most important international marine environmental conventions. It was developed by the International Maritime Organization with an objective to minimize pollution of the oceans and seas, including dumping, oil and air pollution.

The original MARPOL was signed on 17 February 1973, but did not come into force at the signing date. The current convention is a combination of 1973 Convention and the 1978 Protocol, which entered into force on 2 October 1983. As of January 2018, 156 states are parties to the convention, being flag states of 99.42% of the world's shipping tonnage.

All ships flagged under countries that are signatories to MARPOL are subject to its requirements, regardless of where they sail, and member nations are responsible for vessels registered on their national ship registry.

Provisions 
MARPOL is divided into Annexes according to various categories of pollutants, each of which deals with the regulation of a particular group of ship emissions.

Annex I 

MARPOL Annex I came into force on 2 October 1983 and deals with the discharge of oil into the ocean environment.  It incorporates the oil discharge criteria prescribed in the 1969 amendments to the 1954 International Convention for the Prevention of Pollution of the Sea by Oil (OILPOL). It specifies tanker design features that are intended to minimize oil discharge into the ocean during ship operations and in case of accidents. It provides regulations with regard to the treatment of engine room bilge water (OWS) for all large commercial vessels and ballast and tank cleaning waste (ODME). It also introduces the concept of "special sea areas (PPSE)", which are considered to be at risk to pollution by oil.  Discharge of oil within them has been completely outlawed, with a few minimal exceptions.

The first half of MARPOL Annex I deals with engine room waste. There are various generations of technologies and equipment that have been developed to prevent waste such as oily water separators (OWS), oil content meters (OCM), and port reception facilities.

The second part of the MARPOL Annex I has more to do with cleaning the cargo areas and tanks. Oil discharge monitoring equipment (ODME) is a very important technology mentioned in MARPOL Annex I that has greatly helped improve sanitation in these areas.

The oil record book is another integral part of MARPOL Annex I, helping crew members log and keep track of oily wastewater discharges, among other things.

Annex II  
MARPOL Annex II came into force on 6 April 1987. It details the discharge criteria for the elimination of pollution by noxious liquid substances carried in large quantities. It divides substances into and introduces detailed operational standards and measures. The discharge of pollutants is allowed only to reception facilities with certain concentrations and tions. No matter what, no discharge of residues containing pollutants is permitted within  of the nearest land. Stricter restrictions apply to "special areas".

Annex II covers the International Bulk Chemical Code (IBC Code) in conjunction with Chapter 7 of the SOLAS Convention. Previously, chemical tankers constructed before  must comply with the requirements of the Code for the Construction and Equipment of Ships Carrying Dangerous Chemicals in Bulk (BCH Code).

Annex III 
MARPOL Annex III came into force on 1 July 1992.  It contains general requirements for the standards on packing, marking, labeling, documentation, stowage, quantity subtraction, division and notifications for preventing pollution by harmful substances. The Annex is in line with the procedures detailed in the International Maritime Dangerous Goods (IMDG) Code, which has been expanded to include marine pollutants. The amendments entered into force on 1 January 1991.

Annex IV 
Marpol Annex IV came into force on 27 September 2003.  It introduces requirements to control pollution of the sea by sewage from ships.

Annex V 

MARPOL Annex V (Regulations for the Prevention of Pollution by Garbage from Ships) came into force on 31 December 1988.  It specifies the distances from land in which materials may be disposed of and subdivides different types of garbage and marine debris. The requirements are much stricter in a number of "special areas" but perhaps the most prominent part of the Annex is the complete ban of dumping plastic into the ocean.

Annex VI 
MARPOL Annex VI came into force on 19 May 2005.  It introduces requirements to regulate the air pollution being emitted by ships, including the emission of ozone-depleting substances, Nitrogen Oxides (NOx), Sulfur Oxides (SOx), Volatile Organic Compounds (VOCs) and shipboard incineration. It also establishes requirements for reception facilities for wastes from exhaust gas cleaning systems, incinerators, fuel oil quality, off-shore platforms and drilling rigs, and the establishment of Sulfur Emission Control Areas (SECAs).

IMO 2020 
As of 1 January 2020, new emission standards are enforced for fuel oil used by ships, in a regulation known as IMO 2020. The global sulphur limit (outside SECA's) dropped from an allowed 3.5% sulphur in marine fuels to 0.5%. This will significantly improve the air quality in many populated coastal and port areas, which will prevent over 100,000 early deaths each year, and many more cases of asthma in these regions and cities. Over 170 countries have signed on to the changes, including the United States. This is expected to create massive changes for the shipping and oil industries, with major updates required to ships and the increased production of lower sulfur fuel.

Bunker fuels used within an emission control zone (i.e. North Sea) must have a sulphur content level of less than 0.1% (1000ppm).

The IMO has worked on ensuring consistent implementation of the 0.5% sulphur limit in its Marine Environmental Protection Committee (MEPC) and its subcommittee on Pollution Prevention and Response (PPR). This has led to the development on several regulatory and practical measures (FONAR's, Carriage Ban, Ship Implementation Plan etc.) to enable any non-compliance to be detected, for example during port State controls (PSC's).

Amendments

MARPOL Annex VI amendments according with MEPC 176(58) came into force 1 July 2010.

Amended Regulations 12 concerns control and record keeping of Ozone Depleting Substances.

Amended Regulation 14 concerns mandatory fuel oil change over procedures for vessels entering or leaving SECA areas and FO sulphur limits.

MARPOL Annex V has been amended multiple times, changing different aspects of the original text.

MEPC.219(63) came into force on 2 March 2012 to generally prohibit the discharge of any garbage into the ocean, with the exception of food wastes, cargo residues, wash-water, and animal carcasses. There are further provisions describing when and how to dispose of the acceptable wastes.

MEPC.220(63) came into force on 2 March 2012 to encourage the creation of a waste management plan on-board vessels.

Implementation and enforcement

In order for IMO standards to be binding, they must first be ratified by a total number of member countries whose combined gross tonnage represents at least 50% of the world's gross tonnage, a process that can be lengthy.  A system of tacit acceptance has therefore been put into place, whereby if no objections are heard from a member state after a certain period has elapsed, it is assumed they have assented to the treaty.

All six Annexes have been ratified by the requisite number of nations; the most recent is Annex VI, which took effect in May 2005. The country where a ship is registered (Flag State) is responsible for certifying the ship's compliance with MARPOL's pollution prevention standards. Each signatory nation is responsible for enacting domestic laws to implement the convention and effectively pledges to comply with the convention, annexes, and related laws of other nations.  In the United States, for example, the relevant implementation legislation is the Act to Prevent Pollution from Ships.

One of the difficulties in implementing MARPOL arises from the very international nature of maritime shipping. The country that the ship visits can conduct its own examination to verify a ship's compliance with international standards and can detain the ship if it finds significant noncompliance. When incidents occur outside such country's jurisdiction or jurisdiction cannot be determined, the country refers cases to flag states, in accordance with MARPOL. A 2000 US GAO report documented that even when referrals have been made, the response rate from flag states has been poor.

On January 1, 2015, maritime shipping levels became legally subject to new MARPOL directives because the SECA (Sulphur Emission Controlled Areas) zone increased in size. This larger SECA zone will include the North Sea, Scandinavia, and parts of the English Channel. This area is set to include all of the Republic of Ireland's international waters in 2020 culminating in all of Western Europe's subjection to the MARPOL directive. This has proven controversial for shipping and ferry operators across Europe.

Concerns have been raised about the environmental damage moving back to the roads by some of the larger ferry operators that ship substantial amounts of freight and passenger traffic via these routes affected by IMO standards. They claim that MARPOL will drive up ferry costs for the consumer and freight forwarding companies pushing them back onto the European roadways as a financially more cost effective measure compared to increased ferry costs, thereby defeating the object of reducing water pollution.

Enforcement of MARPOL Annex VI 
Concerns have also been raised whether the emission regulation in MARPOL Annex VI, such as the 0.5% global sulphur limit, can be enforced on international waters by non-flag States, as some ships sail under a flag of convenience. It is believed that the United Nations Convention on the Law Of the Sea (UNCLOS) allows port States to assert jurisdiction over such violations of emission regulation (also of future regulations of GHG) when they occur on the high seas. Coastal States can assert jurisdiction over violations occurring within their waters, with certain exceptions pertaining to innocent passage and the right of transit passage. The special obligations for flag States and the broadened jurisdictions for coastal and port States, to enforce MARPOL (including Annex VI) are found within the special provisions of part XII of UNCLOS.

See also 
 Crude oil washing
 International Maritime Organization
 Marine energy management
 Marine fuel management
 Merchant Shipping (Pollution) Act 2006
 Ship pollution
 Oil Pollution Act van 1990
 MARPOL Annex I
 Oily water separator (marine)
 Oil content meter
 Port Reception Facilities

References

External links

 International Convention for the Prevention of Pollution from Ships, 1973, as modified by the Protocol of 1978 relating thereto (MARPOL 73/78) 
 Amendments to the Annex of the Protocol of 1978 relating to the International Convention for the Prevention of Pollution from Ships, Treaty available in ECOLEX-the gateway to environmental law (English)
 IMO Overview of Emission Control Areas

Environmental treaties
Water pollution
Environmental impact of shipping
Ocean pollution
International Maritime Organization treaties
Treaties concluded in 1973
Treaties concluded in 1978
Treaties entered into force in 1983
Admiralty law treaties
1983 in the environment
1978 in London
Treaties of Albania
Treaties of Algeria
Treaties of Angola
Treaties of Antigua and Barbuda
Treaties of Argentina
Treaties of Australia
Treaties of Austria
Treaties of Azerbaijan
Treaties of the Bahamas
Treaties of Bahrain
Treaties of Bangladesh
Treaties of Barbados
Treaties of Belarus
Treaties of Belgium
Treaties of Belize
Treaties of the People's Republic of Benin
Treaties of Bolivia
Treaties of Brunei
Treaties of Brazil
Treaties of the People's Republic of Bulgaria
Treaties of Cambodia
Treaties of Cameroon
Treaties of Canada
Treaties of Cape Verde
Treaties of Chile
Treaties of the People's Republic of China
Treaties of Colombia
Treaties of the Comoros
Treaties of the Republic of the Congo
Treaties of the Cook Islands
Treaties of Ivory Coast
Treaties of Croatia
Treaties of Cuba
Treaties of Cyprus
Treaties of Czechoslovakia
Treaties of the Czech Republic
Treaties of North Korea
Treaties of Denmark
Treaties of Djibouti
Treaties of Dominica
Treaties of the Dominican Republic
Treaties of Ecuador
Treaties of Egypt
Treaties of El Salvador
Treaties of Equatorial Guinea
Treaties of Estonia
Treaties of Fiji
Treaties of Finland
Treaties of France
Treaties of Gabon
Treaties of the Gambia
Treaties of Georgia (country)
Treaties of West Germany
Treaties of East Germany
Treaties of Ghana
Treaties of Greece
Treaties of Guatemala
Treaties of Guinea
Treaties of Guyana
Treaties of Honduras
Treaties of the Hungarian People's Republic
Treaties of Iceland
Treaties of India
Treaties of Indonesia
Treaties of Iran
Treaties of Ireland
Treaties of Israel
Treaties of Italy
Treaties of Jamaica
Treaties of Japan
Treaties of Jordan
Treaties of Kazakhstan
Treaties of Kenya
Treaties of Kiribati
Treaties of Kuwait
Treaties of Latvia
Treaties of Lebanon
Treaties of Lithuania
Treaties of Luxembourg
Treaties of Madagascar
Treaties of Malawi
Treaties of Malaysia
Treaties of the Maldives
Treaties of Malta
Treaties of the Marshall Islands
Treaties of Mauritania
Treaties of Mauritius
Treaties of Mexico
Treaties of Moldova
Treaties of Monaco
Treaties of Mongolia
Treaties of Montenegro
Treaties of Morocco
Treaties of Mozambique
Treaties of Myanmar
Treaties of Namibia
Treaties of the Netherlands
Treaties of New Zealand
Treaties of Nicaragua
Treaties of Nigeria
Treaties of Niue
Treaties of Norway
Treaties of Oman
Treaties of Pakistan
Treaties of Palau
Treaties of Panama
Treaties of Papua New Guinea
Treaties of Peru
Treaties of the Philippines
Treaties of the Polish People's Republic
Treaties of Portugal
Treaties of Qatar
Treaties of Romania
Treaties of the Soviet Union
Treaties of Saint Kitts and Nevis
Treaties of Saint Lucia
Treaties of Saint Vincent and the Grenadines
Treaties of Samoa
Treaties of São Tomé and Príncipe
Treaties of Saudi Arabia
Treaties of Senegal
Treaties of Serbia and Montenegro
Treaties of Seychelles
Treaties of Singapore
Treaties of Sierra Leone
Treaties of Slovakia
Treaties of the Solomon Islands
Treaties of South Africa
Treaties of Spain
Treaties of Sri Lanka
Treaties of Suriname
Treaties of Sweden
Treaties of Switzerland
Treaties of Syria
Treaties of Thailand
Treaties of Togo
Treaties of Tonga
Treaties of Trinidad and Tobago
Treaties of Tunisia
Treaties of Turkey
Treaties of Turkmenistan
Treaties of Tuvalu
Treaties of Ukraine
Treaties of the United Arab Emirates
Treaties of the United Kingdom
Treaties of Tanzania
Treaties of the United States
Treaties of Uruguay
Treaties of Vanuatu
Treaties of Venezuela
Treaties of Vietnam
Treaties of Yugoslavia
Treaties of the Libyan Arab Jamahiriya
1973 in London
Treaties extended to Greenland
Treaties extended to the Faroe Islands
Treaties extended to the Netherlands Antilles
Treaties extended to Aruba
Treaties extended to the Isle of Man
Treaties extended to Jersey
Treaties extended to the Cayman Islands
Treaties extended to Bermuda
Treaties extended to Gibraltar
Treaties extended to the Falkland Islands
Treaties extended to the British Virgin Islands
Treaties extended to British Hong Kong
Treaties extended to Portuguese Macau